Thomas Bennett or Thomas Bennet may refer to:

Thomas Bennett

Politicians
 Thomas Bennett (lord mayor) (1543–1627), English merchant who was Lord Mayor of London in 1603
 Thomas Bennett (MP for Hindon) (1620–1644), English politician who sat in the House of Commons from 1641 to 1644
 Thomas Bennett (MP for Nottinghamshire) ( 1674–1738), British Whig politician, in office 1732–1738
 Thomas Bennett Jr. (1781–1865), Governor of South Carolina, 1820–1822
 Thomas Bennett (Newfoundland politician) (1788–1872), merchant, magistrate and politician in Newfoundland
 Thomas R. Bennett (1830–1901), merchant, magistrate and politician in Newfoundland
 Thomas W. Bennett (territorial governor) (1831–1893), governor of Idaho Territory, 1871–1875
 Thomas Bennett (Canadian politician) (1835–1908), mayor of Strathcona, Alberta
 Thomas Jewell Bennett (1852–1925), British Member of Parliament for Sevenoaks, 1918–1923
 Thomas Westropp Bennett (1867–1962), Irish politician
 Thomas M. Bennett (born 1956), member of the Illinois House of Representatives

Other
 Thomas A. Bennett (1803–1897), Irish Carmelite priest
 Thomas Bennett (architect) (1887–1980), British architect, responsible for much of the development of the Crawley and Stevenage
 Thomas Bennett Community College in Crawley, England, named for the architect
 Thomas Bennett (cricketer) (1866–1942), Australian cricketer
 Thomas Bennett (footballer) (1891–1923), English footballer
 Thomas Bennett (musician) ( 1784–1848), English organist
 Thomas W. Bennett (conscientious objector) (1947–1969), U.S. Army medic and the second conscientious objector to win the Medal of Honor
 Thomas Oliver Bennett (1852–1905), rugby union footballer for Wakefield Trinity
 Thomas Boutflower Bennett (1808–1894), early colonist of South Australia
 Tom Bennett (footballer) (born 1969), Scottish footballer
 Tom Bennett (actor), British actor
 Tom Bennett (author), British blogger and author

Thomas Bennet
 Thomas Bennet (academic), Master of University College, Oxford
Thomas Bennet (clergyman) (1673–1728), English clergyman
Thomas Bennet (grammarian) (c. 1645–1681), English grammarian
Thomas Bennet (lawyer) (1592–1670), English lawyer